J. Garland Warren (May 19, 1935 – May 3, 2010) was a Canadian football player who played for the Winnipeg Blue Bombers. He won the Grey Cup with Winnipeg in 1958, 1959, 1961 and 1962. He played college football at the University of North Texas. In 2010, he died, aged 74.

References

1935 births
Winnipeg Blue Bombers players
2010 deaths